Kodalamogaru  is a village in Manjeshwaram Taluk of Kasaragod district in the state of Kerala, India.

Demographics
 India census, Kodalamogaru had a population of 5776 with 2889 males and 2887 females.

Transportation
Local roads have access to National Highway No.66 which connects to Mangalore in the north and Calicut in the south.  The nearest railway station is Manjeshwar on Mangalore-Palakkad line. There is an airport at Mangalore.

Languages
This locality is an essentially multi-lingual region. The people speak Malayalam,  Tulu, Beary bashe and Konkani. Migrant workers also speak Hindi language.

Administration
This village is part of Manjeswaram assembly constituency which is again part of Kasaragod (Lok Sabha constituency)

References

Manjeshwar area